Ilmur Kristjánsdóttir (born 19 march 1978) is an Icelandic actress, screenwriter and politician. She is known for her role as Hinrika in the Icelandic TV series Trapped.

Early life 
Ilmur was born in Reykjavik, Iceland in 1978 to parents Margrét Sigurðardóttir and Kristján Guðmundsson, a high school teacher. She has two siblings, Lísa, born 1974, a filmmaker, and Sverrir, born 1980, a film editor.

She graduated from Menntaskólinn við Hamrahlíð in 1998. She then graduated from the acting division of the Icelandic Academy of the Arts in 2003.

Personal life 
Ilmur is in a relationship with Magnús Viðar Sigurðsson, director of RVK Studios. The couple have one son, born on New Year's Day 2014. Ilmur also has a daughter from a previous relationship, born in 2006.

In 2014 Ilmur represented the Bright Future party as a candidate in the Reykjavik City Mayor election. She was voted in as chair of the welfare committee in 2015.

Ilmur is a supporter of UNICEF Iceland and once traveled to Mozambique with the organisation.

Filmography 
 Dís (2004) as Blær
 Stelpurnar (TV-series) (2005) in various roles
 Áramótaskaupið 2006
 Áramótaskaupið 2007
 Brúðguminn (2008) as Matthildur
 Stóra Planið (2008) as Júlía
 Ástríður (TV-series) (2009) as Ástríður (also credited as writer and creator)
 Algjör Sveppi og leitin að Villa (2009) as Cute Girl
 Reyndu aftur (Short) (2010) as Tinna
 Ófeigur gengur aftur (2013) as Anna Sól
 Fúsi (2015) as Sjöfn
 Ófærð (2015) as Hinrika

References

External links 
 

Living people
1978 births
Ilmur Kristjansdottir
Ilmur Kristjansdottir
Ilmur Kristjansdottir
Ilmur Kristjansdottir
Ilmur Kristjansdottir
Ilmur Kristjansdottir
Ilmur Kristjansdottir
Ilmur Kristjansdottir
Icelandic actor-politicians
Women screenwriters